The International Commission on Nuclear Non-proliferation and Disarmament is a joint initiative of the Australian and Japanese governments. It was proposed by Australian Prime Minister Kevin Rudd on 9 June 2008, and on 9 July 2008 Rudd and Japanese Prime Minister Yasuo Fukuda agreed to establish it.

The Commission is co-chaired by former Australian foreign minister Gareth Evans and former Japanese foreign minister Yoriko Kawaguchi. Key goals for the Commission include undertaking preparatory work for the Nuclear Non-Proliferation Treaty Review Conference in 2010, including shaping a global consensus in the lead-up to the Review Conference.

The Commission presented its report on 15 December 2009.

References
 Commission report: Eliminating Nuclear Threats – A Practical Agenda for Global Policymakers
 Nuclear Terms Handbook. The United States Department of Energy. Office of Nonproliferation and National Security and Office of Emergency Management. 1996.

Arms control
Nuclear weapons policy
Foreign relations of Australia
Foreign relations of Japan
International Commission on Nuclear Nonproliferation and Disarmament
International Commission on Nuclear Nonproliferation and Disarmament